The 1899 Nebraska Bugeaters football team represented the University of Nebraska in the 1899 college football season. The team was coached by first-year head coach Alonzo Edwin Branch and played their home games at Antelope Field in Lincoln, Nebraska. They competed as an independent.

Following the departure of Fielding H. Yost following the 1898 season, Nebraska hired Branch, a recent graduate of Williams College with little football coaching experience. In his only season as head coach, Branch led Nebraska to its first losing season, and only sub-.500 record in its first 38 years of football.

This was NU's final season as the "Bugeaters", as the university officially changed its nickname to "Cornhuskers" in 1900.

Schedule

Coaching staff

Roster

Game summaries

at Lincoln High

Nebraska met the Lincoln High School football team in a pre-season exhibition game for the second time. It is unclear whether the score was the result of a tightly contested game, or an act of sportsmanship by the university team against high schoolers.

at Iowa State

Nebraska suffered its worst-ever defeat to open the 1899 season, trailing 28–0 at halftime and losing 33–0. Iowa State had begun preparation for the football season prior to that start of the school year, a practice not commonplace at the time.

Kansas City Medics

A second-half touchdown from each team culminated in a 6–6 tie.

Missouri

Despite a valiant defensive performance, Nebraska's offensive woes continued in an 11–0 loss, the second of five times NU was shut out in 1899.

at Kansas City Medics

After playing to a 6–6 tie weeks earlier, Nebraska could not keep pace with the Kansas City Medics in their second meeting.

Iowa

Nebraska was shut out for the third consecutive week by Iowa in Omaha.

at Drake

Nebraska defeated Drake 12–6 in what would be the first and only college football head coaching win for Branch (after a brief stint at Miami (OH), he ended his career with a record of 1–11–1).

Kansas

Despite a strong second-half performance against Kansas in Lincoln, Nebraska was unable to overcome a 24–5 deficit. The team's performance was so poor that rumors began to spread suggesting team captain and starting halfback Charles Williams may quit the team.

at South Dakota

Nebraska led 5–0 in its first-ever game against South Dakota, but were unable to capitalize on scoring opportunities in the first half. A second-half touchdown gave South Dakota a 6–5 victory. Team captain Charles Williams left the NU program following the game.

Grinnell

Grinnell became the fifth team to shut out Nebraska in 1899, defeating the Bugeaters 12–0 on a muddy, wet afternoon in Omaha.

References

Nebraska
Nebraska Cornhuskers football seasons
Nebraska Bugeaters football